The Riksdag (also   or Sveriges riksdag ) is the legislature and the supreme decision-making body of Sweden. Since 1971, the Riksdag has been a unicameral legislature with 349 members, elected proportionally and serving, since 1994, fixed four-year terms. The 2022 Swedish general election is the most recent general election.

The constitutional mandates of the Riksdag are enumerated in the Instrument of Government, and its internal workings are specified in greater detail in the Riksdag Act. The seat of the Riksdag is at Parliament House, on the island of Helgeandsholmen in the central parts of Stockholm. The Riksdag has its institutional roots in the feudal Riksdag of the Estates, traditionally thought to have first assembled in Arboga in 1435. In 1866, following reforms of the 1809 Instrument of Government, that body was transformed into a bicameral legislature with an upper chamber and a lower chamber.

Name 

The Swedish word riksdag, in definite form riksdagen, is a general term for "parliament" or "assembly", but it is typically only used for Sweden's legislature and certain related institutions. In addition to Sweden's parliament, it is also used for the Parliament of Finland and the Estonian Riigikogu, as well as the historical German Reichstag and the Danish Rigsdagen. In Swedish use, riksdagen is usually uncapitalized. Riksdag derives from the genitive of rike, referring to royal power, and dag, meaning diet or conference; the German word Reichstag and the Danish Rigsdag are cognate. The Oxford English Dictionary traces English use of the term "Riksdag" in reference to the Swedish assembly back to 1855.

History 

The roots of the modern Riksdag can be found in a 1435 meeting in the city of Arboga; however, only three of the estates were probably present:  the nobility, the clergy and the burghers. This informal organization was modified in 1527 by the first modern Swedish king, Gustav I Vasa, to include representatives from all the four social estates: the nobility, the clergy, the burghers (property-owning commoners in the towns such as merchants etc.), and the yeomanry (freehold farmers). This form of Ständestaat representation lasted until 1866, when representation by estate was abolished and the modern bicameral parliament established.  Effectively, however, it did not become a parliament in the modern sense until parliamentary principles were established in the political system in Sweden, in 1917.

On 22 June 1866, the Riksdag decided to reconstitute itself as a bicameral legislature, consisting of Första kammaren or the First Chamber, with 155 members and Andra kammaren or the Second Chamber with 233 members. The First Chamber was indirectly elected by county and city councillors, while the Second Chamber was directly elected by universal suffrage. This reform was a result of great discontent with the old Estates, which, following the changes brought by the beginnings of the  industrial revolution, was no longer able to provide representation for large segments of the population.

By an amendment to the 1809 Instrument of Government, the general election of 1970 was the first to a unicameral assembly with 350 seats. The following general election to the unicameral Riksdag in 1973 gave the Government the support of only 175 members, while the opposition could mobilize an equal force of 175 members. In a number of cases a tied vote ensued, and the final decision had to be determined by lot. To avoid any recurrence of this unstable situation, the number of seats in the Riksdag was reduced to 349, from 1976 onwards.

Powers and structure 

The Riksdag performs the normal functions of a legislature in a parliamentary democracy. It enacts laws, amends the constitution and appoints a government. In most parliamentary democracies, the head of state commissions a politician to form a government. Under the new Instrument of Government (one of the four fundamental laws of the Constitution) enacted in 1974, that task was removed from the Monarch of Sweden and given to the Speaker of the Riksdag.
To make changes to the Constitution under the new Instrument of Government, amendments must be approved twice, in two successive electoral periods with a regular general election held in between.

There are 15 parliamentary committees in the Riksdag.

Membership 

As of September 2022, 163 members, or 46.7% of the 349 members are women. Five parties have a majority representation of female MPs as of 2022: the Left Party (17 of 24, 70.8%), the Green Party (12 of 18, 66.7%), the Liberals (9 of 16, 56.3%), the Center Party (13 of 24, 54.2%), and the Social Democratic Party (55 of 107, 51.4%). The party with the lowest share of female MPs is the Sweden Democrats (18 of 73, 24.7%).

Members of the Riksdag are full-time legislators with a salary of 71 500 SEK (around $6,300) per month.

According to a survey investigation by the sociologist Jenny Hansson, Members of the Riksdag have an average work week of 66 hours, including side responsibilities. Hansson's investigation further reports that the average member sleeps 6.5 hours per night.

Presidium  
The presidium consists of a speaker and three deputy speakers. 
They are elected for a 4-year term. The Speaker is not allowed to vote, but the three deputies are allowed to vote.

Government 

The speaker of the Riksdag nominates a Prime Minister (literally minister of state) after holding talks with leaders of the various party groups in the Riksdag. The nomination is then put to a vote. The nomination is rejected (meaning the Speaker must find a new nominee) only if an absolute majority of the members (175 members) vote "no"; otherwise, it is confirmed. This means the Riksdag can consent to a Prime Minister without casting any "yes" votes.

After being elected the Prime Minister appoints the cabinet ministers and announces them to the Riksdag. The new Government takes office at a special council held at the Royal Palace before the Monarch, at which the Speaker of the Riksdag formally announces to the Monarch that the Riksdag has elected a new Prime Minister and that the Prime Minister has chosen his cabinet ministers.

The Riksdag can cast a vote of no confidence against any single cabinet minister, thus forcing a resignation. To succeed, a vote of no confidence must be supported by an absolute majority (175 members) or it has failed.

If a vote of no confidence is cast against the Prime Minister this means the entire government is rejected. A losing government has one week to call for a general election or else the procedure of nominating a new Prime Minister starts anew.

Parties 

No party has won a single majority in the Riksdag since 1968. Political parties with similar agendas consequently cooperate on several issues, forming coalition governments or other formalized alliances.

Two major blocs existed in parliament until 2019, the socialist/green Red-Greens and the conservative/liberal Alliance. The latter—consisting of the Moderate Party, Liberals, Centre Party, and Christian Democrats—governed Sweden from 2006 through most of 2014 (after 2010 through a minority government). The Red-Greens combination disbanded on 26 October 2010 but continued to be considered the main opposition until the 2014 election, following which the Social Democrats and the Green Party formed a government with support from the Left Party.

In 2019, after the 2018 election in which neither bloc won a majority of seats, the Social Democrats and Green Party formed a government with support from the Liberals and Centre Party, breaking the center-right Alliance. In March 2019, the Christian Democrats and Moderate Party signaled a willingness to talk with the Sweden Democrats.

Elections 

All 349 members of the Riksdag are elected in the general elections held every four years. All Swedish citizens who turn 18 years old no later than on the day of the election and have at one point been registered residents are eligible to vote. To stand for election, a candidate must be eligible to vote and be nominated by a political party. A minimum of 4% of the national vote is required for a party to enter the Riksdag, alternatively 12% or more within a constituency. Substitutes for each deputy are elected at the same time as each election, so by-elections are rare. In the event of a snap election, the newly elected members merely serve the remainder of the four-year term.

Constituencies and national apportionment of seats 

The electoral system in Sweden is proportional. Of the 349 seats in the unicameral Riksdag, 310 are fixed constituency seats allocated to 29 multi-member constituencies in relation to the number of people entitled to vote in each constituency. The remaining 39 adjustment seats are used to correct the deviations from proportional national distribution that may arise when allocating the fixed constituency seats. There is a constraint in the system that means that only a party that has received at least four per cent of the votes in the whole country participates in the distribution of seats. However, a party that has received at least twelve per cent of the votes in a constituency participates in the distribution of the fixed constituency seats in that constituency.

2022 election results

See also 

Parliament House, Stockholm
Referendums in Sweden

References 

Bibliography

External links 

The Riksdag – official site
The history of the Riksdag

 
Sweden
Sweden
Sweden
Politics of Sweden
1866 establishments in Sweden